Jenn Elizabeth Murray (born 1 April 1986) is a Northern Irish actress. In 2009, she received an IFTA Award nomination for her role in the film Dorothy Mills (2008). Her other notable roles were in Brooklyn (2015), Fantastic Beasts and Where to Find Them (2016), and Maleficent: Mistress of Evil (2019).

In 2022, she was nominated for outstanding solo performance for the play A Girl is a Half-Formed Thing by Broadway World.

Filmography

References

External links
 
 Jenn Murray Lands Role In 'The Day Of The Triffids' 
 Role of Dorothy puts Jenn Murray on the road to Hollywood
 'Earthbound' Lands in Irish Cinemas in March

Living people
Actresses from Belfast
21st-century actresses from Northern Ireland
Film actresses from Northern Ireland
Television actresses from Northern Ireland
1986 births